Vincenzo Labini (28 April 1735 – 30 April 1807) was an Italian archbishop who served as Bishop of Malta from 1780 till 1807.

Biography
Labini was born in Bitonto, Italy on April 28, 1735. In 1758 he was ordained priest of the Sovereign Military and Hospitaller Order of St. John of Jerusalem better known as the Knights of St John. In 1780 Pope Pius VI appointed Labini as Bishop of Malta upon the resignation of Bishop Giovanni Carmine Pellerano. He was consecrated on June 25, 1780 by Cardinal Bernardino Giraud. It was on March 3, 1797 that the Cathedral Church of Malta was elevated to the Archiepiscopal dignity, since the bishops of Malta became Archbishops of Rhodes and Bishops of Malta thus Labini was the first to be given this title. Vincenzo Labini was an intimate friend of St Alphonsus Maria de' Liguori the Bishop of St Agata dei Goti and founder of the Redemptorists.

Some of the changes that Labini brought in Malta were that the procession of St Gregory was transferred from March 12 to the Wednesday after Easter, he ordered daily Sacramental Benediction in all parish churches and that bells must be rung every Thursday, an hour after sunset, in memory of the institution of the Eucharist. He also consecrated many of the churches in Malta. Labni led the diocese under three different occupants: the Knights, the French and the British. Archbishop Labini died on April 30, 1807 and was buried in the Cathedral at Mdina.

References

1735 births
1807 deaths
Archbishops of Malta
Italian Roman Catholic archbishops
Knights of Malta
Bishops of Malta